St. Marys is a city in Camden County, Georgia, United States, located on the southern border of Camden County on the St. Marys River in the state's Low Country. The Florida border is just to the south across the river, Cumberland Island National Seashore is to the northeast, and Kingsland, Georgia, is to the west. Jacksonville, Florida, is 38 miles south, and Savannah, Georgia, is 110 miles north.

The city is home to the National Seashore's visitor center and boat access; the St. Marys Submarine Museum, and Crooked River State Park. It is bordered by Kings Bay Naval Submarine Base, home port for several . The city hosts the annual St. Marys Rock Shrimp Festival.  

The area was first explored in the mid-16th century by Spanish expeditions as part of the settlement of Spanish Florida. Through the decades it also came under the colonial influence of Great Britain and finally the United States. By the 2020 census, the city had a population of 18,256.

Geography
St. Marys is located along the southern border of Camden County on the north bank of the St. Marys River. The state of Florida is to the south, across the river. The city of Kingsland borders St. Marys to the west.

Climate 
St. Marys has a humid subtropical climate (Cfa) with long, hot summers and short, mild winters.

History
The St. Marys river area was first explored by Spanish expeditions in the mid 16th century as part of the settlement of Spanish Florida, with nearby St. Augustine as the established capital. The original Spanish settlement was founded in 1566, making this the second-oldest continuously inhabited European-established settlement in the what became contiguous United States. Settlement for colonial Georgians became legal after the Treaty of Paris in 1763, when Britain exchanged some territory with Spain after defeating France in the Seven Years War. 

Following independence in the American Revolutionary War, local inhabitants of Camden County gathered on Cumberland Island and signed a charter for "a town on the St. Marys" on November 20, 1787. There were twenty charter members, who each received four town lots and one marsh lot (outside the boundary of the town on the east side in the marshes); each lot was  square, with the total town area being . These twenty city founders are named on an historical marker in downtown St. Marys: Isaac Wheeler, William Norris, Nathaniel Ashley, William Ashley, Lodowick Ashley, James Seagrove, James Finley, John Fleming, Robert Seagrove, Henry Osborne, Thomas Norris, Jacob Weed, John Alexander, Langley Bryant, Jonathan Bartlett, Stephen Conyers, William Keady, Prentis Gallup, Simeon Dillingham and Richard Cole.

The original boundaries of the town correspond to the modern waterfront, Bartlett Street, North Street, and a block east of Norris Street. There were two public town squares. However, in the original deed the town was unnamed, and for several years afterwards in public documents it was referred to as either St. Marys or St. Patrick's, and colloquially as simply "the New Town". Accounts differ regarding the origin of the name—some say it is named after the St. Marys River, while others say it comes from a seventeenth-century Spanish mission, Santa Maria, on nearby Amelia Island, Florida. St. Marys was recognized by an act of the Georgia legislature on December 5, 1792, with the result of incorporation in November 1802.

Oak Grove Cemetery is included in the St. Marys Historic District and was laid outside the western border of St. Marys during its founding in 1787.

On June 29, 1796, the Treaty of Colerain was signed just up the river from St Marys between the United States and the Creek Nation, the indigenous inhabitants of this territory.  St. Marys town founder Langley Bryant served as the official interpreter between the Creek Indians and the United States.

St. Marys was made a United States port of entry by act of the U.S. Congress March 2, 1799. The first Collector was James Seagrove. During the antebellum period, Archibald Clark served as the U.S. Customs Collector from 1807 until his death in 1848.

After the Act Prohibiting Importation of Slaves took effect in 1808, St. Marys became, along with Spanish Amelia Island, a center for smuggling, especially during the period between 1812-1819 when various rebel groups held Amelia Island.

During the War of 1812 the Battle of Fort Peter occurred near the town, at the fort on Point Peter along the St. Marys River. The British captured the fort and the town and occupied it for about a month.

The United States Navy bombarded the town's shoreside buildings during the American Civil War.

St. Marys served as Camden County's seat of government from 1869 until 1923.

Demographics

2020 census

As of the 2020 United States census, there were 18,256 people, 6,966 households, and 4,998 families residing in the city.

2000 census
As of the census of 2000, there were 13,761 people, 4,837 households, and 3,758 families residing in the city. The racial makeup of the city was 72.78% White, 19.99% African American, 0.47% Native American, 1.21% Asian, 0.07% Pacific Islander, 1.56% from other races, and 2.09% from two or more races. Hispanic or Latino people of any race were 4.46% of the population.

There were 4,837 households, out of which 47.8% had children under the age of 18 living with them, 59.8% were married couples living together, 14.2% had a female householder with no husband present, and 22.3% were non-families. 16.8% of all households were made up of individuals, and 2.9% had someone living alone who was 65 years of age or older. The average household size was 2.83 and the average family size was 3.18.

In the city has a population with 33.4% under the age of 18, 11.2% from 18 to 24, 34.7% from 25 to 44, 15.6% from 45 to 64, and 5.2% who were 65 years of age or older. The median age was 28 years. For every 100 females, there were 97.8 males. For every 100 females age 18 and over, there were 95.3 males.

The median income for a household in the city was $42,087, and the median income for a family was $46,065. Males had a median income of $35,419 versus $24,449 for females. The per capita income for the city was $18,099. About 9.6% of families and 11.2% of the population were below the poverty line, including 14.5% of those under age 18 and 7.1% of those age 65 or over.

Gallery of photos

See also

Cumberland Island
Duck House
Orange Hall (St. Marys, Georgia)
List of county seats in Georgia (U.S. state)
St. Marys Historic District (Georgia)
St. Marys Railroad
St. Marys Airport
St. Marys River
Gilman Paper Company
Battle of Fort Peter

References

External links

St. Marys visitors website
Radio Museum in St. Marys

 
Cities in Camden County, Georgia
Populated coastal places in Georgia (U.S. state)
Populated places established in 1792
1792 establishments in Georgia (U.S. state)
Micropolitan areas of Georgia (U.S. state)
Cities in Georgia (U.S. state)
Former county seats in Georgia (U.S. state)